Wild Mountain Nation is the third studio album by Blitzen Trapper.  The album was honored as "Best New Music" by Pitchfork, receiving a rating of 8.5 out of 10.

Sub Pop Records describes the album as such:

Track listing
All songs written by Eric Earley.

References

2007 albums
Blitzen Trapper albums
Sub Pop albums